Trinity Episcopal Church is a historic church at the junction of North Elm and Market Streets in Searcy, Arkansas.  It is a single story brick building, built in the English parish church style in 1902, and is joined by a small connector to a 1935 parish house of similar construction.  It is the only church of this style in White County.  Its main facade has buttressed corners, and a large lancet-arched window at the center, with the main entrance set recessed in a projecting gabled section to its left.

The building was listed on the National Register of Historic Places in 1992.

See also
National Register of Historic Places listings in White County, Arkansas

References

External links
Trinity Church web site

1902 establishments in Arkansas
Episcopal church buildings in Arkansas
Churches on the National Register of Historic Places in Arkansas
Gothic Revival church buildings in Arkansas
Churches completed in 1902
Churches in White County, Arkansas
National Register of Historic Places in Searcy, Arkansas